Z-Man Games is an American board game company, incorporated in 1999. It was named after its founder, Zev Shlasinger. The company is known for their Pandemic series of board games, as well as being the sole publisher for the English editions of popular Eurogames, such as Carcassonne and Terra Mystica.

History
Z-Man Games was primarily formed to bring the collectible card game Shadowfist back into publication.

In 2011, Sophie Gravel, owner of Quebec-based publisher/distributor Filosofia, bought Z-Man Games, creating F2Z Entertainment.  Shlasinger left Z-Man Games in January 2016. In 2016, F2Z Entertainment was acquired by Asmodee.

Published games
 A B-movie card game series consisting of games such as Grave Robbers From Outer Space and Cannibal Pygmies in the Jungle of Doom
 1960: The Making of the President, an original creation by Z-Man Games
 Agricola
 Arimaa, an abstract strategy game
 Ascending Empires, a space based empire expansion game
 Carcassonne, Z-Man Games has published the English version of this game in the US and Canada since 2012
 Endeavor, a complex strategy game edited by Z-Man Games in 2009
 Gheos, a game where players take on the role of deities
 Neuroshima Hex! 
 Omlevex, a role-playing supplement for Mutants & Masterminds, Champions, and Silver Age Sentinels
 Onirim, and the Oniverse series of short single-player games: Sylvion, Castellion, Nautilion, and Aerion
 Pandemic, a cooperative board game
 Saboteur, a mining path card game
 Shadow Hunters
 Shadowfist
 Start Player by Ted Alspach, a card game to determine who goes first in the following game
 Terra Mystica, by Jens Drögemüller and Helge Ostertag, winner of the 2013 International Gamers Award - General Strategy: Multi-player Winner
 Ursuppe
 The Walking Dead, a 2009 board games based on the comic of the same name
The Walking Dead: The Prison, "both a stand-alone game and an expansion module to the first game", funded through Kickstarter

See also
 Going Cardboard – a documentary about board games in which Shlasinger is interviewed

References

External links
Z-Man Games website

Board game publishing companies
Card game publishing companies
Role-playing game publishing companies
Companies based in New York (state)
American companies established in 1999